Events from the year 1861 in Russia

Incumbents
 Monarch – Alexander II

Events

  
 
  
  
 
 
  

 February 27 – Russian troops fire on a crowd in Warsaw protesting Russian rule, killing 5 protesters.
 March 3 (February 19 O.S.) – Emancipation reform of 1861: Serfdom is abolished.
 March 13 – Tsushima incident: the Russian corvette Posadnik arrives at Tsushima Island in the Korea Strait, Japan, provoking a reaction from the Japan.
 April 24 (N.S.) – Bezdna in Russia is the scene of a peasant uprising; the military open fire and nearly 5000 are killed.
 May 21 – Russian sailors clash with Japanese samurai and farmers at Tsushima island.

Births

 16 November - Arvid Järnefelt, Finnish author (d. 1932)

Deaths

References

1861 in Russia
Years of the 19th century in the Russian Empire